Diffusivity, mass diffusivity or diffusion coefficient is usually written as the proportionality constant between the molar flux due to molecular diffusion and the negative value of the gradient in the concentration of the species. More accurately, the diffusion coefficient times the local concentration is the proportionality constant between the negative value of the mole fraction gradient and the molar flux. This distinction is especially significant in gaseous systems with strong temperature gradients. Diffusivity derives its definition from Fick's law and plays a role in numerous other equations of physical chemistry.

The diffusivity is generally prescribed for a given pair of species and pairwise for a multi-species system. The higher the diffusivity (of one substance with respect to another), the faster they diffuse into each other. Typically, a compound's diffusion coefficient is ~10,000× as great in air as in water. Carbon dioxide in air has a diffusion coefficient of 16 mm2/s, and in water its diffusion coefficient is 0.0016 mm2/s.

Diffusivity has dimensions of length2 / time, or m2/s in SI units and cm2/s in CGS units.

Temperature dependence of the diffusion coefficient

Solids 
The diffusion coefficient in solids at different temperatures is generally found to be well predicted by the Arrhenius equation:

where
D is the diffusion coefficient (in m2/s),
D0 is the maximal diffusion coefficient (at infinite temperature; in m2/s),
EA is the activation energy for diffusion (in J/mol),
T is the absolute temperature (in K),
R ≈ 8.31446J/(mol⋅K) is the universal gas constant.

Liquids 
An approximate dependence of the diffusion coefficient on temperature in liquids can often be found using Stokes–Einstein equation, which predicts that

where
 D is the diffusion coefficient,
 T1 and T2 are the corresponding absolute temperatures,
 μ is the dynamic viscosity of the solvent.

Gases 
The dependence of the diffusion coefficient on temperature for gases can be expressed using Chapman–Enskog theory (predictions accurate on average to about 8%):

where
 D is the diffusion coefficient (cm2/s),
 A is an empirical coefficient equal to 
 1 and 2 index the two kinds of molecules present in the gaseous mixture,
 T is the absolute temperature (K),
 M is the molar mass (g/mol),
 p is the pressure (atm),
  is the average collision diameter (the values are tabulated page 545) (Å),
 Ω is a temperature-dependent collision integral (the values are tabulated but usually of order 1) (dimensionless).

Pressure dependence of the diffusion coefficient
For self-diffusion in gases at two different pressures (but the same temperature), the following empirical equation has been suggested:

where
 D is the diffusion coefficient,
 ρ is the gas mass density,
 P1 and P2 are the corresponding pressures.

Population dynamics: dependence of the diffusion coefficient on fitness

In population dynamics, kinesis is the change of the diffusion coefficient in response to the change of conditions. In models of purposeful kinesis, diffusion coefficient depends on fitness (or reproduction coefficient) r:

where  is constant and r depends on population densities and abiotic characteristics of the living conditions. This dependence is a formalisation of the simple rule: Animals stay longer in good conditions and leave quicker bad conditions (the  "Let well enough alone" model).

Effective diffusivity in porous media

The effective diffusion coefficient describes diffusion through the pore space of porous media. It is macroscopic in nature, because it is not individual pores but the entire pore space that needs to be considered. The effective diffusion coefficient for transport through the pores, De, is estimated as follows:

where
D is the diffusion coefficient in gas or liquid filling the pores,
εt is the porosity available for the transport (dimensionless),
δ is the constrictivity (dimensionless),
τ is the tortuosity (dimensionless).

The transport-available porosity equals the total porosity less the pores which, due to their size, are not accessible to the diffusing particles, and less dead-end and blind pores (i.e., pores without being connected to the rest of the pore system).  The constrictivity describes the slowing down of diffusion by increasing the viscosity in narrow pores as a result of greater proximity to the average pore wall. It is a function of pore diameter and the size of the diffusing particles.

Example values 
Gases at 1 atm., solutes in liquid at infinite dilution.  Legend: (s) – solid; (l) – liquid; (g) – gas; (dis) – dissolved.

See also
Atomic diffusion
Effective diffusion coefficient
Lattice diffusion coefficient
Knudsen diffusion

References

Transport phenomena
Diffusion